Adriano Costa is a Brazilian Paralympic footballer who won bronze medal for being a participant at the 2000 Summer Paralympics in Sydney, Australia and was awarded silver medal for the 2004 Summer Paralympics in Athens, Greece.

References

External links
 

20th-century births
Year of birth missing (living people)
Living people
Paralympic 7-a-side football players of Brazil
Paralympic silver medalists for Brazil
Paralympic bronze medalists for Brazil
Paralympic medalists in football 7-a-side
7-a-side footballers at the 2000 Summer Paralympics
7-a-side footballers at the 2004 Summer Paralympics
Medalists at the 2000 Summer Paralympics
Medalists at the 2004 Summer Paralympics